Maurice Michael O'Connell (5 March 1917 – 17 August 2005) was an Australian rules footballer who played with Richmond in the Victorian Football League (VFL).

O'Connell later served in the Australian Army during World War II.

Notes

External links 

1917 births
2005 deaths
Australian rules footballers from Victoria (Australia)
Richmond Football Club players